The Rome Grand Prix, also known as the Premio Reale di Roma (1925–1932) and Gran Premio di Roma (1947–1991), was an automobile race held in Rome, Italy from 1925 until 1991.

Through the years a number of different regulations and circuits were used, with the majority being Formula Two races at the ACI Vallelunga Circuit. In 1954 and 1963 the Rome Grand Prix was run to Formula One rules, but neither event was included in the World Championship.

The 1947 race was notable as it marked the first win for Ferrari with a car of their own construction, the Ferrari 125 S.

In 1985 the European Grand Prix was originally scheduled to take place in the EUR district of Rome as a round of the 1985 Formula 1 World Championship scheduled to take place on the 6th October but the race was moved to the UK where it was held at Brands Hatch. But in the late 2000s this was revived, as plans were being made for a Rome Grand Prix to be added to the Formula One World Championship in 2013. A street circuit around the EUR district of Rome was to be the location of the race. However, speculation that the race would threaten the Italian Grand Prix at Monza, as well as a lack of support from local residents, led to the plans being abandoned in early 2011. Since 2018, Formula E has held the Rome ePrix in the area, using some parts of the route proposed for the Formula 1 race.

Race winners
The winners of the Rome Grand Prix from its inception in 1925 are:

References 

 
Pre-World Championship Grands Prix
Formula One non-championship races
European Formula Two Championship
Formula races
Sports car races
Auto races in Italy
Sports competitions in Rome